Aramaic history may refer to:

 History of the Aramaic language, general history of the Aramaic language and its variants
 History of the Old Aramaic languages, specific history of the Old Aramaic languages
 History of the Neo-Aramaic languages, specific history of modern Neo-Aramaic languages
 History of the Aramaic people, variant term for the history of the ancient Aramean people

See also
 Aramaic (disambiguation)
 Aramean (disambiguation)